The 2020 Northern Ontario Scotties Tournament of Hearts, the Northern Ontario women's curling championship, was held from January 29 – February 2 at the Don Shepherdson Memorial Arena in New Liskeard, Temiskaming Shores. The winning Krista McCarville rink represented Northern Ontario at the 2020 Scotties Tournament of Hearts in Moose Jaw, Saskatchewan and finished in fourth place. The event was held in conjunction with the 2020 Northern Ontario Men's Provincial Curling Championship, the provincial men's championship.

Krista McCarville won her eighth Northern Ontario Scotties Tournament of Hearts by defeating the young Krysta Burns rink in a tight 6–5 final. She and her teammates represented Northern Ontario at the Hearts for the second year in a row. The Burns rink also featured experienced curler Amanda Gates who used to play with the Sudbury based Tracy Fleury rink.

Teams
The teams are listed as follows:

Round-robin standings
Final round-robin standings

Round-robin results
All draws are listed in Eastern Time.

Draw 1
Wednesday, January 29, 1:30 pm

Draw 2
Wednesday, January 29, 8:00 pm

Draw 3
Thursday, January 30, 10:00 am

Draw 4
Thursday, January 30, 2:30 pm

Draw 5
Thursday, January 30, 7:30 pm

Draw 6
Friday, January 31, 9:30 am

Draw 7
Friday, January 31, 2:30 pm

Draw 8
Friday, January 31, 7:30 pm

Draw 9
Saturday, February 1, 9:30 am

Draw 10
Saturday, February 1, 2:30 pm

Tiebreaker
Saturday, February 1, 7:30 pm

Playoffs

Semifinal
Sunday, February 2, 9:30 am

Final
Sunday, February 2, 5:30 pm

References

External links

2020 in Ontario
Curling in Northern Ontario
2020 Scotties Tournament of Hearts
January 2020 sports events in Canada
February 2020 sports events in Canada
Temiskaming Shores
Ontario Scotties Tournament of Hearts